Sukhdev Ahluwalia (born January 5, 1932) is a Punjabi film director.

Ahluwalia began his career in the film industry as an assistant cameraman with Modern Studios working with the director Suraj Prakash on a number of Flindi films before turning to writing and directing melodrama. He later worked in video.

His filmography includes: Do Sher (1974), Dharamjeet (1975), Taakra (1976), Do Sholay (1977), Jai Mata Sheran Wali (1978), Til Til Da Lekha (1979), Kunwara Mama (1979), Ambe Maa Jagadambe Maa (1980), Sajre Phool (1981), Kashmeera (1983), Maanwan Thandian Chhanwan (1984), Takraar (1985), Maahi Mera Chan Varga (1987), Sounh Menoo Punja Di (1990).

References

External links 
 

1932 births
Cinematographers from Punjab, India
Punjabi people
Living people
Indian Sikhs
Ahluwalia